Thomas Hill (by 15001557), of Gray's Inn, London, Worcester and White Ladies Aston, Worcestershire, was an English politician.

He was a Member (MP) of the Parliament of England for Worcester in 1529, 1536 and April 1554, and for Heytesbury in October 1553.

References

Year of birth missing
1557 deaths
Members of the Parliament of England for Worcester
Members of Gray's Inn
English MPs 1529–1536
English MPs 1536
English MPs 1553 (Mary I)
English MPs 1554